James Deahl (born 1945) is a Canadian poet and publisher. He is known for his 1987 collaboration with Milton Acorn, A Stand of Jackpine.

References

External links
German biography and official translations of his poems

20th-century Canadian poets
20th-century Canadian male writers
Canadian male poets
21st-century Canadian poets
Place of birth missing (living people)
American emigrants to Canada
Writers from Pennsylvania
Writers from Hamilton, Ontario
1945 births
Living people
21st-century Canadian male writers